Frederick Jagiellon (27 April 1468 – 14 March 1503) was a Polish prince, Archbishop of Gniezno, Bishop of Kraków, and Primate of Poland. He was the sixth son and ninth child of Casimir IV Jagiellon, King of Poland and Grand Duke of Lithuania, and his wife Elizabeth of Austria, known as 'Matka Jagiellonów' (Mother of the Jagiellons).

Frederick ruled two dioceses with devotion. He cared about the cult of saints, the appropriate education of the clergy, took care of the liturgical life, carried out the diocesan and provincial synods. He also cared about the liturgy, foundations, and restoring of churches, including the restoration of the Kraków and Gniezno Cathedrals.

Life
Frederick was born in Kraków, and was named after the Holy Roman Emperor Frederick III. His godfather was Protazy, Bishop of Olomouc. After the death of Bishop Jan Rzeszów, he was elected Archbishop of Kraków on 13 April 1488. His father sought to secure him the Bishopric of Warmia in Prussia, but the Frauenburg (now Frombork) cathedral chapter of the Diocese of Warmia elected Lucas Watzenrode in 1489.

He worked for the Polish throne in 1492 together with his brother, John I Albert, and in 1501 he contributed to the nomination of another of his brothers, King Alexander, who strengthened the Polish–Lithuanian union. After the death of Zbigniew Oleśnicki on 2 October 1493, he was appointed Archbishop of Gniezno (and Polish Primate at the same time). From that moment on he held the two traditionally most important bishoprics in Poland. His position in the Polish Church strengthened after his promotion to cardinal by Pope Alexander VI on 20 September 1493, having received the title of Sanctae Lucia in Septomsoliis in December that year. After being appointed Archbishop of Gniezno, Frederick received episcopal consecration.

He died in the Bishop's Palace in Kraków after a long illness, in March 1503.

Bibliography
Hubert Kaczmarski, Votes of Polish Primates, Warsaw 1988.
Piotr Nitecki, The Bishops of the Church in Poland in the year 965, Warsaw 2000. .

References

External links
 Virtual tour Gniezno Cathedral  
List of Primates of Poland 

Attribution
This article is based on the corresponding article of the Polish Wikipedia. A list of contributors can be found there at the History section.

1468 births
1535 deaths
Bishops of Kraków
Archbishops of Kraków
Archbishops of Gniezno
Polish Prince Royals
Frederick
Cardinals created by Pope Alexander VI
15th-century Roman Catholic bishops in Poland
Burials at Wawel Cathedral
Sons of kings